Leonardo Nicolás Pisculichi (born 18 January 1984) is an Argentine retired footballer who played as an attacking midfielder. He won the Copa Sudamericana in 2014 and Copa Libertadores in 2015 with River Plate.

Club career
Pisculichi started his career with Argentinos Juniors, making his first division debut on 20 February 2002, against Talleres de Córdoba. He was transferred to Spain's RCD Mallorca on 4 January 2006.

On 30 November 2006, he was transferred to Al-Arabi Sports Club in Doha, Qatar for €3.6 million, with the move being made effective in January of the following year. 

In July 2012, Pisculichi transferred to the Chinese Super League side Shandong Luneng Taishan. In 2014, he joined the Argentine powerhouse River Plate.
During his tenure at River Plate, he won the 2014 Copa Sudamericana against Atletico Nacional. He left River in December 2016 and signed for Brazilian side Esporte Clube Vitória in January 2017.

Return to Argentina
Having left Vitória in May 2017, Pisculichi returned to the newly promoted Argentinos Juniors in August 2017. He was the first signee of the campaign.

Burgos CF
In June 2019, Pisculichi joined Spanish Segunda División B club Burgos CF.

International career
Pisculichi played in the 2003 South American Youth Championship that was held in Uruguay, representing the Argentina youth football team. He started in the game against hosts Uruguay and scored in the 82nd minute. He also came on as a substitute in a match against Brazil.

He was set to be naturalized to play for the Qatar national team by 2009. However, he neglected to mention that he had previously represented the Argentina under-20 team, rendering him ineligible to play for the Qatar team without special permission from FIFA.

The same scenario occurred in 2012. The Al-Arabi administration wanted to naturalize him so they could have an extra foreign player in their squad to participate in the AFC Champions League. He did not gain Qatari citizenship and the club's management were criticized by the local media.

Personal life
Pisculichi is of Croatian descent. His family Hispanicized their surname Piškulić (originally from the town of Novi Vinodolski) to its current spelling.

Career statistics

Club

Honors
River Plate
Copa Sudamericana: 2014
Recopa Sudamericana: 2015
Copa Libertadores: 2015

Vitória
 Campeonato Baiano: 2017

References

External links

 Argentine League statistics  
 

1984 births
Living people
Sportspeople from Buenos Aires Province
Argentine people of Croatian descent
Argentine footballers
Argentina under-20 international footballers
Association football forwards
Argentine Primera División players
Argentinos Juniors footballers
La Liga players
RCD Mallorca players
Club Atlético River Plate footballers
Argentine expatriate footballers
Expatriate footballers in Spain
Argentine expatriate sportspeople in Spain
Al-Arabi SC (Qatar) players
Expatriate footballers in Qatar
Qatar Stars League players
Chinese Super League players
Expatriate footballers in China
Shandong Taishan F.C. players
Esporte Clube Vitória players
Club Atlético Temperley footballers
Burgos CF footballers
Campeonato Brasileiro Série A players
Segunda División B players
Primera Nacional players